Noworyta is a surname. Notable people include:

 Paul Noworyta, American vert skater
 Przemysław Noworyta, Polish figure skater

See also
 

Polish-language surnames